Smurfit Art Collection is a collection of art work  by the businessman Michael Smurfit. The Smurfit art collection contains work by such artists as Jack Butler Yeats, Louis le Brocquy, Sir John Lavery, Donald Teskey, Peter Collis, Martin Mooney, Norah McGuinness, and Anne Madden. The collection contains 500 pieces built up over 20 years of collection.

References 

Private collections in the Republic of Ireland